Philonotis calcarea (vernacular name: thick-nerved apple-moss) is a species of moss belonging to the family Bartramiaceae.

It is native to Europe and Northern America.

References

Bartramiales